The Men's Team large hill/4 x 5 km at the FIS Nordic World Ski Championships 2011 was held on 4 March 2011. The ski jumping part of this event took place at 11:30 CET while the cross-country part of the event took place at 15:30 CET. Japan's team of Yūsuke Minato, Taihei Kato, Akito Watabe, and Norihito Kobayashi were the defending world champions while the Austrian team of Bernhard Gruber, Felix Gottwald, Mario Stecher, and David Kreiner were the defending Olympic champions.

Ski Jumping

Cross-Country

References

FIS Nordic World Ski Championships 2011